John Trotman (born 14 April 1834, date of death unknown) was a Barbadian cricketer. He played in one first-class match for the Barbados cricket team in 1864/65.

See also
 List of Barbadian representative cricketers

References

External links
 

1834 births
Year of death missing
Barbadian cricketers
Barbados cricketers
People from Saint George, Barbados